The 1930 South American Basketball Championship was the first edition of this regional tournament, the first major international basketball tournament. It is the earliest competition recognized by the International Basketball Federation, founded in 1932.  It was held in Montevideo, Uruguay and won by the host nation.

Final rankings

Results

Each team played the other three teams twice apiece, for a total of six games played by each team.

External links

FIBA.com archive for SAC1930

1930
S
B
1930 in Uruguayan sport
1930s in Montevideo
Sports competitions in Montevideo
December 1930 sports events